Mirza Ali-Aqa Tabrizi, known as Thiqat-ul-Islam Tabrizi (January 19, 1861 - December 31, 1911) was an Iranian nationalist who lived in Tabriz, Iran, during the Iranian Constitutional Revolution and was a reformist Shia cleric. He was hanged by Russian troops with 12 other Iranians in Bagh-e Shomal at the age of 50 during Russian Invasion of Tabriz, 1911. He is buried in Mausoleum of Poets, Tabriz.

Early life and education
He was born in Tabriz in 1861. His father Haj Mirza Sahfie Sadr, Thiqa tul-Islam of Tabriz, was a dominant figure in the Tobacco Protest. Ali Aqa studied in Tabriz, Najaf, and Karbala. After the death of his father he was given the title of Thiqa tul-Islam by the king Mozaffar ad-Din Shah Qajar.

Ideas

Public awareness
He was one of the influential intellectuals among the people of Tabriz. During the first democratic revolution of Asia, the Constitutional Revolution of Iran, one major concern of Akhund Khurasani and other pro-democracy Marja's was to familiarize the public with the idea of a democratic nation-state and modern constitution. The enlightened Thiqa tul-islam from Tabriz, wrote a treatise “Lalan”(). In his essays, Thiqat al-Islam Tabrizi mentions his sermons that he was delivering in Tabriz to explain the core concepts of democracy, that helped the junior clerics increase their knowledge about modern statehood and plan their speeches.

Views about modern knowledge
Thiqat-ul-Islam showed unwavering support for modern knowledge and technology,  and saw it necessary means to avoid colonial takeover of Iran. He said:

Human liberty
Thiqa tul-Islam saw democratic freedom and liberty as God's special gift. He said:

He saw freedom of press and of personal expression as the instruments for obeying the Quranic command of enjoining the good and forbidding the evil.

Confronting bigotry
When Fazlullah Nouri tried to get a veto power for his Tehran based mullah-comrades under the banner of Jurist Council, Mirza Ali Aqa opposed the idea saying that only the opinion of the sources of emulation is worthy of consideration in the matters of faith. He wrote:

And
{{quote|Let us consider the idea that the constitution is against Sharia law: all oppositions of this kind are in vain because the hujjaj al-islam of the atabat, who are today the models (marja''') and the refuge (malija) of all Shiites, have issued clear fatwas that uphold the necessity of the Constitution. Aside from their words, they have also shown this by their actions. They see in Constitution the support for splendour of Islam.}}
He firmly opposed the idea of a supervisory committee of Tehran's clerics censoring the conduct of the parliament,  and said that:

During the period of “Lesser Despotism”, he played a key role in bringing the people of Tabriz together in support of democracy and tried to minimize bloodshed. Akhund Khurasani wrote a personal letter of support to him, praising his efforts to preserve religious values, educating the public about core national interests, bringing the people and the leadership closer and opposing foreign exploitation.

The term Ayatullah
He was the first one to use the term Ayatullah for the sources of emulation in Najaf.

Assassination

After the conclusion of the Tabriz Siege by Russian forces a conflict between the Russian forces and the revolutionaries broke out on December 21, 1911. The Russians insisted that he should sign a letter confirming the responsibility of revolutionaries in starting the conflict. He refused, and Russians hanged him with twelve others on the day of Ashura, December 31, 1911. The Russians continued to kill the constitutional revolutionaries of Tabriz and their relatives en masse and many civilians of Tabriz as well. The total number of executions is estimated to have been about 1,200.

The original photography of his hanging is currently shown in Azerbaijan Museum.
Legacy
His life was depicted in the TV-series Seghatolislam'' by Hojjat Ghasem-Zadeh-Asl, produced by 
Sahar TV (also see the :fr:Sahar TV French page).

See also 
Muhammad Kazim Khurasani 
Mirza Husayn Tehrani 
Abdallah Mazandarani 
Iranian Constitutional Revolution 
Intellectual movements in Iran
Mirza Malkom Khan
Mirza Hussein Naini
Constitution House of Tabriz
Occupation of Tabriz by Russian army in 1911

Bibliography 

ʿALĪ ĀQĀ TABRĪZĪ, MIRZA, Encyclopædia Iranica

References

1861 births
1911 deaths
Executed Iranian people
People executed by the Russian Empire
People executed by the Russian Empire by hanging
People of the Persian Constitutional Revolution
People from Tabriz
Iranian revolutionaries
Burials in Maqbaratoshoara